Richard Steve Goldberg (born November 9, 1945) is a convicted sex offender and a former fugitive who was added to the FBI's Ten Most Wanted Fugitives list on June 14, 2002. Goldberg is the 474th fugitive to be placed on the list. He was captured in Montreal, Canada on May 12, 2007, and subsequently convicted and sentenced to imprisonment of 20 years.

Child molestation accusations
In 2001, Goldberg, a former Boeing aerospace engineer originally from Brooklyn, New York, became a babysitter in the Long Beach, California area by gaining the trust of neighborhood parents and making his home attractive to children. Goldberg had several children's items such as computer games, children's music, art supplies, swings, children's soap, and cages with rabbits and ducks.

On May 11, 2001, two young girls playing on Goldberg's computer saw an image of two of their young friends naked with their neighbor. Authorities were alerted and an investigation was launched when six neighborhood children reported being sexually assaulted by Goldberg. Police searched his home in June 2001 and seized his computer. Investigators discovered images of child pornography on his computer, including photos of Goldberg himself, engaged in sex acts with children. Goldberg was arrested, and he fled after $50,000 had been posted for his bail.

In July 2001, a state arrest warrant was issued in California charging Goldberg with six counts of lewd acts upon a child and two counts of possession of child pornography. Goldberg was subsequently charged with unlawful flight to avoid prosecution in a federal arrest warrant issued by the United States District Court for the Central District of California.

Fugitive
Goldberg visited his parents briefly in Rumson, New Jersey after leaving Long Beach. On July 26, 2001, he crossed the Canada–United States border, claiming to be on a business trip and using his U.S. passport. Despite his status on the FBI's list, he was able to withdraw nearly $50,000 from his U.S. bank account to finance the six years he spent in hiding in Montreal. Goldberg lived under the fictitious name Terry Wayne Kearns, backed by a Saskatchewan birth certificate, and was living off his savings and keeping a low profile. He was added to the FBI's Ten Most Wanted Fugitives list on June 14, 2002. He was considered armed and extremely dangerous. The FBI offered a reward of up to $100,000 for information leading to Goldberg's capture.

Capture

In May 2007, Goldberg had been seeing a nonprofit counselor. He allegedly told the counselor he was an American fugitive, but the charges against him were "trumped up". The counselor had identified Goldberg as one of the FBI's Ten Most Wanted Fugitives and verified the outstanding arrest warrant for Goldberg by visiting the FBI's website, where Goldberg's photo and a description of his crimes were posted. He then told the FBI's Los Angeles Field Office where Goldberg was. Agents at the Los Angeles Office sent the information to the FBI's legal attaché at the U.S. Embassy in Ottawa, Canada. The Attaché sought help from Canadian law enforcement authorities in Montreal. Members of the Royal Canadian Mounted Police (RCMP) and the Montreal Police Service (MPS) responded immediately and arrested Goldberg without incident at the address provided by the tipster.

After being a fugitive for six years, Goldberg was arrested by the RCMP and MPS for violating Canadian immigration laws on May 12, 2007. On May 24, he was deported from Canada to the United States, where he was tried on both state and federal charges of child sexual abuse and distribution of obscene material involving children.

Goldberg's lawyer, Jeffrey Boro, said his client was preparing to surrender himself days before his arrest. The lawyer suggested that Goldberg's inquiries and requests for help made him easy to track down.

Trial and conviction
On December 10, 2007, Goldberg pleaded guilty in federal court to one count of producing child pornography, and he was sentenced to 20 years in prison. At his sentencing, U.S. District Judge John Walter said: "Goldberg is a deeply disturbed individual with a lack of remorse beyond belief."

Goldberg is currently incarcerated at the Federal Correctional Institution, Fort Dix, a low-security federal prison in Burlington County, New Jersey and subsequently transferred to Federal Medical Center, Devens. His projected release date is October 11, 2024.

See also
National Cyber Security Awareness Month

References

External links

Goldberg's profile on America's Most Wanted

1945 births
American aerospace engineers
American emigrants to Canada
American people convicted of child pornography offenses
American people convicted of child sexual abuse
American prisoners and detainees
Boeing people
Engineers from California
Engineers from New York City
FBI Ten Most Wanted Fugitives
Fugitives
Living people
People deported from Canada
People from Brooklyn
People from Long Beach, California
Prisoners and detainees of the United States federal government